The whistling long-tailed cuckoo (Cercococcyx lemaireae) is a species of cuckoo in the family Cuculidae. It is distributed in West Africa west of the Bakossi Mountains, from Sierra Leone west to eastern Cameroon. 

It was formerly thought to be a disjunct western population of the dusky long-tailed cuckoo (C. mechowi), which it is morphologically indistinguishable from, but it was later split from C. mechowi on account of its different vocalizations. The whistling long-tailed cuckoo has two distinct songs: one described by Nigel James Collar and Peter Boesman as a song of "three rising notes" (phoneticized as "hu hee wheeu") and a Halcyon kingfisher-esque song described by Collar and Boesman as "plaintive whinnying" (phoneticized as "tiutiutiutiutittiui-tiu-tiu-tiu"). On the other hand, the dusky long-tailed cuckoo has two different songs: a song described by Collar and Boesman as "three similar, less melodious notes" (phoneticized as "wheet-wheet-wheet") and a fast, descending song (phoneticized as "wheewheewheewheewhee"). These song differences led to the description of C. lemaireae as a distinct species.

References

whistling long-tailed cuckoo
Birds of West Africa
whistling long-tailed cuckoo